The First Hellenic Republic was the provisional Greek state during the Greek Revolution against the Ottoman Empire. From 1822 until 1827, it was known as the Provisional Administration of Greece, and between 1827 and 1832, it was known as the Hellenic State.

"First Hellenic Republic" is a historiographical term. It is used by academics and the Greek government to emphasize the constitutional and democratic nature of the revolutionary regime prior to the establishment of the independent Kingdom of Greece, and associate this period of Greek history with the later Second and Third Republics.

History

In the first stages of the 1821 uprising, various areas elected their own regional governing councils. These were replaced by a central administration at the First National Assembly of Epidaurus in early 1822, which also adopted the first Greek Constitution, marking the birth of the modern Greek state. The councils continued in existence, however, and central authority was not firmly established until 1824/1825. The new state was not recognized by the Great Powers of the day, which, after initial successes, was threatened with collapse both from within due to civil war and from without through the victories of the Turco-Egyptian army of Ibrahim Pasha.

By 1827 the Greek revolution had almost been extinguished on the mainland, but by this time the Great Powers had come to agree to the formation of an autonomous Greek state under Ottoman suzerainty, as stipulated in the Treaty of London. Ottoman refusal to accept these terms led to the Battle of Navarino, which effectively secured complete Greek independence.

In 1827, the Third National Assembly at Troezen established the Hellenic State and selected Count Ioannis Kapodistrias as Governor of Greece. Therefore, this period is often called Governorate. After his arrival in Greece in January 1828, Kapodistrias actively tried to create a functional state and redress the problems of a war-ravaged country, but was soon embroiled in conflict with powerful local magnates and chieftains. 

During the period of 1828–1830, the island of Samos was incorporated into the Republic as part of the Eastern Sporades province.

Kapodistrias was assassinated by political rivals in 1831, plunging the country into renewed civil strife. He was succeeded by his brother Augustinos, who was forced to resign after six months. The Fifth National Assembly at Nafplion drafted a new royal constitution, while the three "Protecting Powers" (Great Britain, France and Russia) intervened, declaring Greece a Kingdom in the London Conference of 1832, with the Bavarian Prince Otto of Wittelsbach as king.

Heads of the Executive
The following were the heads of government for the First Hellenic Republic:

Provisional Administration of Greece (1822–1827)

Hellenic State (1827–1832)

See also
 History of the Hellenic Republic

References

States and territories established in 1822
States and territories disestablished in 1832
 
Greece
Provisional governments
Political history of Greece
1822 establishments in Greece
1832 disestablishments in Greece